Chiquinho is a nickname for Francisco (Francis) in Portuguese speaking countries, and may refer to the following:

Chiquinho Carlos (born 1963), Brazilian-born footballer who played in the Portuguese leagues in the 1980s and 1990s
Chiquinho Conde (born 1965), Mozambican footballer
Chiquinho (footballer, born 1974) (born 1974), Brazilian footballer
Chiquinho (footballer, born 1980) (born 1980), Portuguese footballer
Chiquinho (footballer, born 1983) (born 1983), Brazilian footballer
Chiquinho (footballer, born 1989) (born 1989), Brazilian footballer
Chiquinho (footballer, born 1995), Portuguese footballer
Chiquinho (footballer, born 2000), Portuguese footballer
Chiquinho (novel), a 1947 novel published by Baltasar Lopes da Silva